German submarine U-117 was a Type XB minelaying U-boat of Nazi Germany's Kriegsmarine during World War II.

She was ordered	on 31 January 1939, and laid down on 1 July 1939, at Friedrich Krupp Germaniawerft, Kiel, as yard number 616. She was launched on 22 July 1941 and commissioned under the command of Fregattenkapitän Hans-Werner Neumann on 25 October of that year.

Service record

First patrol
On 19 September 1942, U-117 departed from Kiel and headed out into the North Atlantic. Her first patrol involved sailing along the coast of Norway and then in the direction of Iceland. Upon reaching the island, she headed for her new home port of Lorient in France. U-117 made no attacks nor was she attacked during her first patrol.

Second patrol
Like her first patrol, U-117s second foray resulted in no attacks on either merchant vessels or the U-boat itself. Following her departure from Königsberg in East Prussia (now Kaliningrad) on 12 October 1942, she traveled up to Iceland once again. Then she headed south into the Bay of Biscay, she reached Lorient on 22 November 1942.

Third patrol
Much like her last two patrols, U-117s third sortie resulted in no contact with any Allied vessels. She departed Lorient on 23 December 1942, and returned on 3 February 1943.

Fourth patrol
U-117s fourth patrol was the first and last time that any Allied vessels were hit by the submarine. Following her departure from Lorient on 31 March 1943, she headed out into the Mid-Atlantic, made a sharp turn upon reaching the Canary Islands and headed for French Morocco. It was in this region that she scored her only two successes of the war. On 11 April 1943, Matt W. Ransom was hit and damaged by a mine from U-117. On 25 April 1943,  struck another mine and was badly damaged.

Fifth patrol and sinking
On 1 December 1942, U-117 was assigned to the 12th U-boat Flotilla at Bordeaux. Her fifth and final patrol began on 22 July 1943 from her base in Bordeaux. Her main objective on this patrol was to lay 66 mines off New York City. On 27 July, U-Boat Control directed U-117 to divert from her course to refuel , which was also heading for North America. U-66 was attacked by aircraft on 3 August, before the rendezvous took place, and was in need of medical assistance. U-117 reached U-66 on 6 August and transferred her ship's doctor and other essentials to U-66.

The next day, Grumman TBF Avenger aircraft (VC-1 USN) from the escort carrier  attacked the two U-boats on the surface while U-117 was refueling U-66. The Avengers dropped depth charges near U-117 and U-66. U-117 tried to help U-66 during the attack, but was attacked herself by a FIDO homing torpedo dropped by another Avenger. Two more Avengers and two F4F Wildcats arrived later from USS Card and forced U-117 to dive and then dropped depth charges. U-117 was hit by one of two FIDO homing torpedoes dropped by the Avengers and sank with the loss of all crew. U-66 was able to escape the Avengers during the attack and make her way back to her home port of Lorient.

Summary of raiding history

See also
 Battle of the Atlantic

References

Bibliography

External links

U-boats commissioned in 1941
U-boats sunk in 1943
World War II submarines of Germany
World War II shipwrecks in the Atlantic Ocean
1941 ships
Ships built in Kiel
German Type X submarines
U-boats sunk by US aircraft
U-boats sunk by depth charges
Maritime incidents in August 1943